Matthew II, (? – 1603) was Ecumenical Patriarch of Constantinople three times, shortly in 1596, from 1598 to 1602 and for a few days in 1603.

Life
Member of the Vlach community, Matthew was born in the village Kleinovo (now part of Kalabaka), and he became Metropolitan of Ioannina. In early 1596, he was elected Ecumenical Patriarch, but the election was not recognized because the Holy Synod that elected him was not attended by all the members; thus, after twenty days, Matthew was forced to resign and moved to Mount Athos.

Matthew was elected again in April 1598. During this Patriarchate, Matthew transferred the patriarchal see from the Church of St. Demetrius Xyloportas, used since 1597, to the unimpressive church of the women's monastery of St. George in the Phanar, where it remains until today as St. George's Cathedral. The Phanar district then became the recognised centre of Greek Christian life in the city. He remained on the throne until January 1602, when he returned to Mount Athos.

Once again, he ascended to the throne in January 1603 and reigned for seventeen days, either until his death, or, according to other sources, until he retired to Mount Athos, where he died in the same year.

Canonizations
Matthew canonized the Blessed Philothei, who was martyred in 1589 in Athens.

Notes

16th-century births
1603 deaths
People from Trikala (regional unit)
16th-century Ecumenical Patriarchs of Constantinople
17th-century Ecumenical Patriarchs of Constantinople
16th-century Greek people
Bishops of Ioannina
Aromanian people